"Why Have There Been No Great Women Artists?" is a 1971 essay by American art historian Linda Nochlin. It was praised for its new slant on feminist art history and theory, and examining the institutional obstacles that prevent women from succeeding in the arts.

Content
In this essay, Nochlin explores the institutional – as opposed to the individual – obstacles that have prevented women in the West from succeeding in the arts. She divides her argument into several sections, the first of which takes on the assumptions implicit in the essay's title, followed by "The Question of the Nude", "The Lady's Accomplishment", "Successes", and "Rosa Bonheur". In her introduction, she acknowledges "the recent upsurge of feminist activity" in America as a condition for her interrogation of the ideological foundations of art history, while also invoking John Stuart Mill's suggestion that "we tend to accept whatever is as natural". In her conclusion, she states: "I have tried to deal with one of the perennial questions used to challenge women's demand for true, rather than token, equality by examining the whole erroneous intellectual substructure upon which the question 'Why have there been no great women artists?' is based; by questioning the validity of the formulation of so-called problems in general and the 'problem' of women specifically; and then, by probing some of the limitations of the discipline of art history itself."

Publication history and legacy
First published in 1971 as "Why Are There No Great Women Artists?" in Woman in Sexist Society: Studies in Power and Powerlessness, Nochlin's essay was revised, retitled "Why Have There Been No Great Women Artists?" and published in the January 1971 issue of ARTnews. It was also released with other essays and photographs in Art and Sexual Politics: Why Have There Been No Great Women Artists? (1971, edited by Thomas B. Hess and  Elizabeth C. Baker). The essay has been reprinted regularly since then, including in Nochlin's Women, Art, and Power and Other Essays (1988) and Women Artists: The Linda Nochlin Reader (2015, edited by Maura Reilly and Nochlin).

"Why Have There Been No Great Women Artists?" is generally considered required reading for the fields of feminist art history and feminist art theory inasmuch as it calls out the institutional barriers to the visual arts that women in the Western tradition historically faced. Nochlin considers the history of women's lack of art education as well as the nature of art and of artistic genius as they are currently defined. The essay has also served as an important impetus for the rediscovery of women artists, followed as it was by the exhibition Women Artists: 1550-1950. Eleanor Munro called it "epochal", and according to Miriam van Rijsingen "it is considered the genesis of feminist art history."

The essay's title and content have inspired a number of essays and publications about the absence of women in certain professional fields, such as "Why Are There No Great Women Chefs?" by Charlotte Druckman (2010). In 1989 an exhibition was held to increase visibility for women artists entitled Women's Work: the Montana Women's Centennial Art Survey Exhibition 1889-1989, inspired by Nochlin's groundbreaking contribution.

References

External links
"Why Have There Been No Great Women Artists?"

1971 essays
American essays
Feminist essays
Women artists
1971 in women's history
Essays about culture